The Military ranks of Vanuatu are the military insignia used by the Vanuatu Police Force and Vanuatu Mobile Force.

Commissioned officer ranks
The rank insignia of commissioned officers.

Other ranks
The rank insignia of non-commissioned officers and enlisted personnel.

Former rank insignia
Commissioned officer ranks
The rank insignia of commissioned officers.

Other ranks
The rank insignia of non-commissioned officers and enlisted personnel.

References

External links
 
 

Military of Vanuatu
Vanuatu and the Commonwealth of Nations